Rubidium hydride is the hydride of rubidium. With the formula RbH, it is classified as an alkali metal hydride. It is a white solid and is insoluble in most solvents. It is synthesized by treating rubidium metal with hydrogen. Rubidium hydride is a powerful superbase and reacts violently with water.

References

Rubidium compounds
Metal hydrides
Superbases
Rock salt crystal structure